Sergio Antonio Llorente Paz (born September 13, 1990) is a Spanish basketball player for Circus Brussels of the BNXT League. He plays in the point guard position.

Career
Son of the former Real Madrid player José Luis Llorente, he started his career in 2010 at LEB Plata team Lobe Huesca, where he achieved the promotion to LEB Oro.

Despite this success, Llorente continued playing in LEB Plata until 2013, when he signed with Força Lleida.

Three years later, in summer 2016, Llorente signed a temporary contract with Dominion Bilbao Basket, for helping the team during the preseason but thanks to his great performances, he agreed a one-year contract with the Basque squad.

Llorente played for Oviedo between 2018 and 2020. During the 2019–20 season, he averaged 7.3 points, 2.5 rebounds and 5.2 assists per game. On September 14, 2020, Llorente signed with Club Melilla Baloncesto of the LEB Oro.

On January 25, 2021, he has signed with Spirou of the Pro Basketball League.

On December 26 2021, after a monthlong trial, he joins Phoenix Brussels for the rest of the 2021-22 BNXT League season. In july 2022 Llorente renews his contract for an additional year in Brussels.

Titles

CEBA Guadalajara
Copa LEB Plata: (1)
2013

References

External links
 ACB profile
 FEB profile

1990 births
Living people
Basketball players from Madrid
Baloncesto Fuenlabrada players
Bilbao Basket players
Brussels Basketball players
CB Breogán players
CB Peñas Huesca players
Força Lleida CE players
Liga ACB players
Oviedo CB players
Point guards
Spanish men's basketball players